"Bloody Mary (Nerve Endings)", often referred to as just "Bloody Mary", is an indie rock song performed by American alternative rock music group Silversun Pickups. The song was written by Silversun Pickups, and produced by Jacknife Lee. It serves as the lead-off single to their third studio album, Neck of the Woods, which was released on May 8, 2012. The song reached the top ten of the Billboard Alternative Songs chart in May 2012, peaking at number seven in June.

Music video
A music video directed by James Frost of The Automatic was released for the song on May 29, 2012.

Personnel
 Brian Aubert – guitar, vocals
 Chris Guanlao – drums
 Joe Lester – keys
 Nikki Monninger – bass, vocals

Chart performance

Weekly charts

Year-end charts

References

2012 singles
Silversun Pickups songs
Song recordings produced by Jacknife Lee
Music videos directed by James Frost
2012 songs
Dangerbird Records singles